This article contains information about the literary events and publications of 1618.

Events
January – Lady Hay and eight other Court ladies plan and rehearse a Ladies' Masque or Masque for Ladies, intended for a Twelfth Night performance, but it is cancelled a few days before, either by King James or Queen Anne.
January 4 – Sir Francis Bacon is appointed Lord Chancellor by King James I of England.
April 6 (Easter Monday) – The King's Men perform Twelfth Night at Court.
April 7 – The King's Men perform The Winter's Tale at Court.
July – Ben Jonson sets out to walk to Scotland.
Catherine de Vivonne, marquise de Rambouillet, begins remodelling the Paris residence which becomes the Hôtel de Rambouillet to form a literary salon.

New books

Prose
William Cecil, 1st Baron Burghley – Certain Precepts or Directions, For the Well-ordering and Carriage of a Man's Life
Renold Elstracke – Braziliologia
Vicente Espinel – Relaciones de la vida del escudero Marcos de Obregón
Robert Fludd – De Musica Mundana
Michael Maier – Atalanta Fugiens
Themis aurea
Daniel Mögling – Speculum Sophicum Rhodo-Stauroticum
John Selden – History of Tythes

Drama
Anonymous – The Tragedy of Amurath
Jakob Ayrer (died 1605) – Opus Theatricum published
Guillén de Castro y Bellvis – Comedias, part 1
Lope de Vega
 (The Pitcher Girls)
El rey don Pedro en Madrid 
Nathan Field – Amends for Ladies published
John Fletcher – The Loyal Subject
Peter Heylin – Theomachia (in Latin)
Barten Holyday – Technogamia
Ben Jonson – masques
Pleasure Reconciled to Virtue
For the Honour of Wales

Poetry

Jacob Cats – Emblemata
Juan Martínez de Jáuregui y Aguilar – Rimas
John Taylor – The Pennylesse Pilgrimage

Births
March 23 – Ferrante Pallavicino, Italian satirist (died 1644)
April – Agustín Moreto y Cavana, Spanish dramatist and priest (died 1661)
Unknown dates
Thomas Blount, English antiquary and lexicographer, (died 1679)
Abraham Cowley, English poet (died 1667)
Raffaello Fabretti, Italian antiquary (died 1700)
Isaac Vossius, Dutch scholar and librarian (died 1689)
Probable year of birth – Jacques Chausson, French writer and criminal (died 1661)

Deaths
July – John Davies of Hereford, Anglo-Welsh poet (born c. 1565)
July 26 – Martinus Smiglecius, Polish Jesuit philosopher (born 1563)
August 23 – Gerbrand Adriaenszoon Bredero, Dutch poet (born 1585)
September 22 – Jacobus Taurinus, Dutch theologian (born 1576)
September 28 – Joshua Sylvester, English poet (born 1563)
October 29 – Sir Walter Ralegh, English adventurer and author (executed, born c. 1554)
Unknown dates
François de Boivin, French chronicler
Richard Stanihurst, Irish translator of Virgil (born 1547)
Probable year – Bento Teixeira, Portuguese poet (born c. 1561)

References

 
Years of the 17th century in literature